The Hariri family is a prominent family from Lebanon, involved in politics and business. They are Jordan's largest real estate property investors.

Notable people 

 Ayman Hariri (born 1978), Lebanese businessman, son of Rafic Hariri
 Bahia Hariri (born 1952), Lebanese politician, sister of Rafic Hariri
 Bahaa Hariri (born 1966), Lebanese business tycoon, son of Rafic Hariri
 Fahd Hariri (born 1980/1981), Lebanese businessman and property developer, the son of Rafic Hariri
 Hind Hariri (born 1984), daughter and youngest child of Rafic Hariri
 Nazik Hariri, widow of Rafic Hariri
 Rafic Hariri (1944–2005), business tycoon and Lebanese Prime Minister; assassinated
 Saad Hariri  (born 1970), politician, business tycoon, Lebanese Prime Minister, and son of Rafic Hariri

References

See also 
 Hariri, for the name itself

External links
Hariri Foundation